Tactics is a live album by jazz guitarist John Abercrombie with organist Dan Wall and drummer Adam Nussbaum that was recorded in 1996 and released by ECM in 1997.

Reception
Scott Yanow of Allmusic stated, "Not sounding at all like a typical soul-jazz organ group, these musicians take more advanced improvisations". The Penguin Guide to Jazz gave the album 3½ stars, stating it contains "churning but still delicate Hammond shapes, a rock steady bass, and some of Abercrombie's lightest and most dancing jazz-playing".

Track listing
All compositions by John Abercrombie except as indicated
 "Sweet Sixteen" – 11:21 
 "Last Waltz" – 11:14 
 "Bo Diddy" (Wall) – 11:43 
 "You and the Night and the Music" (Howard Dietz, Arthur Schwartz) – 10:15 
 "Chumbida" (Nussbaum) – 5:46 
 "Dear Rain" – 7:38 
 "Mr. Magoo" (Wall) – 8:44 
 "Long Ago (and Far Away)" (Ira Gershwin, Jerome Kern) – 9:42

Personnel
 John Abercrombie – guitar
 Dan Wall – Hammond organ
 Adam Nussbaum – drums

References

ECM Records live albums
John Abercrombie (guitarist) albums
1997 albums
Albums produced by Manfred Eicher